Kevin Quinn may refer to:
Kevin Quinn (actor) (born 1997), actor and singer, best known for Bunk'd
Kevin Quinn (Jesuit) (born 1955), American Jesuit, lawyer and president of the University of Scranton
Kevin Quinn (neo-Nazi) (born 1965), British neo-Nazi and leader of the November 9th Society
Kevin Quinn (sportscaster) (born 1958), Canadian sportscaster for Rogers Sportsnet
Kevin Quinn (sportsman) (1923–2002), Irish rugby union and cricket player
Kevin B. Quinn (born 1979 or 1980), American CEO of TransLink
Kevin M. Quinn, U.S. Navy admiral